The Australian Football Media Association Player of the Year award (also known as the Australian Football Media Association MVP award) is an award for the Australian Football League (AFL) given by the Australian Football Media Association (AFMA). It has been awarded annually since 1973, with the exception of 2003, when no award was given.

Winners

References

Australian Football League awards
Australian rules football awards
1973 establishments in Australia